The Louie B. Nunn Center for Oral History, also known as The Nunn Center, the University of Kentucky, is one of the premier oral history centers in the world, known for a comprehensive oral history archival collection, ongoing interviewing projects, as well as being an innovator with regard to enhancing access to archived oral history interviews. The Nunn Center maintains a collection of over 14,000 oral history interviews made up of over 600 projects with an emphasis on: 20th century history; Appalachia; agriculture; African American history; the history of education; immigration; politics, and public policy; LGBTQ+; athletics; the arts; Kentucky writers; quilters and quilting; gender; diversity; the Civil Rights Movement; veterans' experiences; the history of the University of Kentucky; the Peace Corps; the history of healthcare; and industries including the coal, equine, and bourbon industries. Although the Nunn Center began focusing on Kentucky history exclusively, it has expanded to also document oral history projects with national and international significance. The Nunn Center for Oral History is part of the University of Kentucky Libraries Special Collections Research Center.

History
The oral history program at the University of Kentucky Libraries was established in 1973 by Charles Atcher. The Center is named after former Kentucky Governor Louie B. Nunn. From 1974 until 2005, the program was directed by Terry Birdwhistell, Ed.D. followed by Jeffrey Suchanek. Since 2008, the Nunn Center has been directed by Doug Boyd, Ph.D.

Collection
The Nunn Center contains over 14,000 oral history interviews featuring a variety of individuals and projects. Significant oral history projects include: the Family Farm Project, the Colonel Arthur L. Kelly Veterans Oral History Project, University of Kentucky history, African American history in Kentucky, Kentucky writers, Kentucky's medical history, the history of professional baseball, as well as more recent project featuring the Horse Industry in Kentucky, as well as on the Kentucky General Assembly.

Digitization
The Nunn Center has aggressively undertaken efforts to digitize its collection. In 2014 it accelerated efforts to digitize its audio and video collection and is nearing completion of digitization of analog oral history interviews.

Oral History Metadata Synchronizer (OHMS)
In 2008, the Nunn Center launched the Oral History Metadata Synchronizer (OHMS) online interface that synchronizes searchable text to audio and video. This free and open-source software system, designed by Nunn Center director Doug Boyd, Ph.D., enhances access to online oral history by empowering users to link from their search results to corresponding moments in the oral history interview. The OHMS system was featured in an article in the Chronicle of Higher Education in July 2011.

SPOKEdb
In October 2011, the Nunn Center launched SPOKEdb, the online catalog and repository containing records for each oral history interview and project in the Nunn Center's archival collection. Designed by Doug Boyd, Ph.D., SPOKEdb functions as the primary access point for the Nunn Center's oral history collection.  Initially, SPOKEdb was designed for Drupal, and in more recent years SPOKEdb uses Omeka as the content management system. The initial migration to Omeka was managed by Eric Weig and Michael Slone, current development of SPOKEdb is managed by Eric Weig. Doug Boyd, In addition to functioning as an online catalog and repository, SPOKEdb functions as an oral history collection management tool.

Featured projects

 African American Farmers
 Alben Barkley
 Black Church in Kentucky
 Blacks in Kentucky
 Blacks in Lexington
 Anne Braden Oral History Project
 Edward T. Breathitt
 Buffalo Trace Distillery
 A.B. "Happy" Chandler
 Christian Appalachian Project
 Earle C. Clements
 Bert T. Combs
 John Sherman Cooper
 Country Doctors and Nurses
 Harry Caudill
 Horse Industry in Kentucky
 Family and Gender in the Coal Community
 Family Farm Project
 Wendell H. Ford
 From Combat to Kentucky: Student Veterans of the Iraq and Afghanistan Wars
 Frontier Nursing Service
 History of Broadcasting in Kentucky
 History of Education in Kentucky
 History of Medicine in Fayette County, Kentucky
 Walter D. Huddleston
 Immigrants in Coal Communities
 Interscholastic Athletics in Kentucky
 Col. Arthur L. Kelly American Veterans Project
 Kentucky Coal Operators
 Kentucky Conservationists
 Kentucky Family Farm
 Kentucky Folk Art
 Kentucky Legislature
 Kentucky Writers
 Thruston B. Morton
 John Jacob Niles
 Louie B. Nunn
 Peace Corps
 John Ed Pearce
 Politics in Lexington, Kentucky
 Edward F. Prichard
 Race Relations in Owensboro-Daviess County, Kentucky, 1930-1970
 Stanley F. Reed
 Roving Picket Movement in the Coal Fields
 Cora Wilson Stewart
 Tobacco Production Technology and Policy
 University of Kentucky Medical Center
 Urban Appalachian Women in Cincinnati, Ohio
 Veterans of World War Two
 Veterans of the Korean War
 Veterans of the Vietnam War
 Fred M. Vinson
 War on Poverty
 Robert Penn Warren
 Robert Penn Warren Civil Rights Project
 Lawrence W. Wetherby
 Charles T. Wethington Alumni/Faculty Project

References

External links
 Louie B. Nunn Center for Oral History
 
 Kentucky Oral History online public access catalog of collections
 University of Kentucky Libraries
 From Combat to Kentucky Oral History Project: Interviews with Student Veterans at Louie B. Nunn Center for Oral History
 Saving Stories blog at Louie B. Nunn Center for Oral History
 Curiosities and Wonders blog at University of Kentucky Archives and the Louie B. Nunn Center for Oral History

Appalachian culture in Kentucky
University of Kentucky
1973 establishments in Kentucky
Oral history
Archives in the United States